The Fars News Agency is a news agency in Iran managed by the Islamic Revolutionary Guard Corps (IRGC), an armed wing loyal to Supreme Leader Ali Khamenei. While it describes itself as "Iran's leading independent news agency", it is widely described by Western news media to be a "semi-official" news agency of the Government of Iran. All its content is free content, Creative Commons licensed.

History
Fars News Agency was founded in 2003. In addition to Persian reporting, the agency also provides news in English, Turkish, Arabic, and Dari.

Notable stories

Interview with Egyptian president
In June 2012, Fars released an interview with Egyptian President Mohamed Morsi in which Morsi is said to have told Fars that he wanted to restore ties with Iran and wanted to "review" the Egypt–Israel peace treaty. Morsi later disputed the authenticity of the interview. Fars responded by providing what it said was audio of the interview. Arabic newscaster Al Arabiya quoted unnamed experts who said it was not Morsi's voice.

Reposted story by The Onion
In September 2012, the agency picked up a story from The Onion, a satirical newspaper, about a supposed survey showing "an overwhelming majority of rural white Americans would rather vote for Iranian President Mahmoud Ahmadinejad than U.S. President Barack Obama in the upcoming U.S. elections". The Iranian version copied the original word-for-word, even including a made-up quote from a fictional West Virginia resident who says he would rather go to a baseball game with Ahmadinejad because "he takes national defense seriously, and he'd never let some gay protesters tell him how to run his country like Obama does."

Fars News Agency later apologized for its mistake, but claimed that a majority of Americans would prefer anyone outside of the American political system to President Obama and American statesmen.

Time machine story
In April 2013, the agency carried a story claiming a 27-year-old Iranian scientist had invented a time machine that allowed people to see into the future. A few days later the story was removed, and replaced with a story quoting an Iranian government official that no such device had been registered.

Alien/extraterrestrial intelligence agenda reports
In January 2014, Fars posted a series of articles that suggested U.S. security policy was being driven by an "alien/extraterrestrial intelligence agenda". The report said that proof was found in a Federal Security Service report carried out by Edward Snowden. The report said that the United States government had been secretly run by a "shadow government" of space aliens since 1945.

Salman Rushdie fatwa 
In February 2016, Fars was one of 40 Iranian news agencies that pledged money toward the bounty against Salman Rushdie in regards to The Satanic Verses controversy. Fars promised $30,000 for the killing of Rushdie.

Sanctions 
Iranian state News Agency, Fars, an associate of Iran's Revolutionary Guards Corps, has been blocked by the new sanctions applied by US treasury's Office. These sanctions started on 25 January 2020.

Yemenite Jews 
In November 2020, the Agency sparked controversy after it shared an article by Kayhan editor Hossein Shariatmadari denying the Holocaust and saying that the "real Holocaust" was against Yemenite Christians by the Jewish Himyarite Kingdom in 524 CE. Critics denounced the article as an anti-Semitic piece seeking to dehumanize Jews and downplay the brutality of the Holocaust.

See also

List of Iranian news agencies

References

External links

 
 

2003 establishments in Iran
Organizations established in 2003
News agencies based in Iran
Iranian news websites
Creative Commons-licensed websites
Islamic Revolutionary Guard Corps